Ilione is a genus of flies in the family Sciomyzidae, the marsh flies or snail-killing flies.

Species
Ilione Haliday in Curtis, 1837
I. lineata (Fallén, 1820)
I. rossica (Mayer, 1953)
Knutsonia Verbeke, 1964
I. albiseta (Scopoli, 1763)
I. corcyrensis (Verbeke, 1964)
I. trifaria (Loew, 1847)
I. truqui (Rondani, 1863)
I. turcestanica (Hendel, 1903)
I. unipunctata (Macquart, 1849)

References

Sciomyzidae
Sciomyzoidea genera